The VK 30.01 (P)  was the official designation for a heavy tank prototype proposed in Germany. Only two prototype chassis were built. The tank never entered serial production, but was further developed into the VK 45.01 Tiger (P). Porsche called it the Typ (Type) 100.

Beginnings of the VK 30.01 (P)
At the beginning of 1937, the Weapon Testing Office of the German Army's Ordnance Office contracted with Henschel & Son (chassis) and Krupp (turret) for a  heavy breakthrough tank with  armor on the front and sides of the hull and the turret. The turret was to be based on that of the Panzer IV and was to use the same 24-caliber  KwK 37 gun. Development proceeded slowly and only two chassis and one turret had been delivered by mid-1939. The program was later renamed as VK 30 and were developed to varying degrees by four different companies: Porsche, Henschel, MAN, and Daimler Benz. The Porsche version was thus named the VK 30.01 (P). and the Henschel design was the VK 30.01 (H).

Development
Through his membership in the group, Porsche likely became aware that Daimler-Benz had received permission to design a tank outside the normal process where the design office issued specifications that designers had to meet in October. He decided to do the same for the VK 30 program in December using his preferred air-cooled engines. While independent of the testing office, Porsche did receive advice and funding from it for the prototypes. By the end of March 1941 the company was placing orders for major components of the prototypes.

Porsche chose to use a gasoline-electric drivetrain in his Typ 100 tank to eliminate the need for a mechanical transmission, which he felt weren't strong enough for such heavy vehicles. Two air-cooled V-10 Porsche Typ 100 gasoline engines, mounted in the rear of the tank, were each connected to an electric generator. These drove electric motors that were connected to the front drive sprockets for the tracks.

Krupp were directly contracted by Porsche to produce the turret to house the 57-caliber  KwK 36 gun and the two teams worked together to develop it for the VK 30.01 (P) chassis. A fully developed drawing with the Krupp turret was completed, dated 5 March 1941. The Krupp turret would be used on both the Porsche and the Henschel Tiger.

The requirements for the new development of a 30-tonne schwerer Panzerkampfwagen included the ability to mount at least the 7.5 cm KwK L/24 main gun with a desire to fit the 10.5 cm KwK L/28 if possible. Later, in 1941, the German Army encountered —unexpectedly— heavily armored enemy vehicles such as the Soviet T-34 and KV-1. Plans were then made to instead mount the more effective 8,8 cm KwK L/56.

Notes

References

Bibliography

World War II heavy tanks
World War II tanks of Germany
Heavy tanks of Germany